Matías Jesús Celis Contreras (born on January 9 of 1989) is a Chilean footballer, who plays for Deportes Recoleta as a defender or midfielder. He began his career in the youth system of Universidad de Chile before making his debut in the 2009 Apertura tournament against Santiago Morning.

International 
He debuted with Chile in a friendly against Mexico, played in the United States.

Honours

Club
Universidad de Chile
Primera División de Chile (1): 2009 Apertura

External links
 
 
 
 

1989 births
Living people
Chilean footballers
Chile international footballers
Universidad de Chile footballers
Association football fullbacks